The College of Arts and Sciences (CAS) is the liberal arts and sciences college at the University of Nebraska–Lincoln (NU) in Lincoln, Nebraska. CAS was established in 1869, the same year the University of Nebraska was founded, and is the largest of NU's nine colleges. Mark Button has served as dean of the college since 2019.

The College of Arts and Sciences contains the departments of Humanities, Natural and Mathematical Sciences, Social and Behavioral Sciences, and Interdisciplinary Programs.

History
The College of Arts and Sciences was founded in 1869, making it the first college established at the University of Nebraska (now the University of Nebraska–Lincoln). CAS began offering classes two years later in University Hall, which at the time was the only building on NU's campus. Charles Henry Oldfather led the college from 1932 to 1952, making him the longest-serving dean of CAS; the twelve-story Oldfather Hall was dedicated in his memory upon its opening in 1970.

CAS's Department of Physics and Astronomy operates the Behlen Observatory in Mead, Nebraska, approximately forty miles from Lincoln. The facility, constructed in 1972, contains a Cassegrain telescope and is named after donor Walter Behlen. The college operates eleven other research centers: the Center for Digital Research in the Humanities, Center for Great Plains Studies, Center for Brain, Biology and Behavior, Center on Children, Families and the Law, Center for Integrated Biomolecular Communication, Materials Research Sciences and Engineering Center, Nebraska Center for Materials and Nanoscience, Nebraska Center for Virology, Center for Plant Science Innovation, Center for Science, Mathematics and Computer Education, and Rural Drug Addiction Research Center.

Schools

CAS is made up of four departments: Humanities, Natural and Mathematical Sciences, Social and Behavioral Sciences, and Interdisciplinary Programs. They combine to offer twenty-nine degree and twenty-four minor-only programs.

The Humanities department offers degrees in classics and religious studies, film studies, history, languages, and philosophy as well as five minor-only programs.

The Natural and Mathematical Sciences department offers degrees in actuarial science, biochemistry, biological sciences, chemistry, geology, mathematics, meteorology, microbiology, and physics as well as three minor-only programs.

The Social Sciences department offers degrees in anthropology, communication studies, economics, geography, political science, psychology, and sociology as well as two minor-only programs.

The Interdisciplinary Programs department offers degrees in environmental studies, ethnic studies, global studies, and women's and gender studies as well as fourteen minor-only programs.

External links
College of Arts and Sciences

References

University of Nebraska–Lincoln
Liberal arts colleges at universities in the United States